James Morris (December 16, 1857 – June 12, 1931) was a farmer, marble and granite dealer and political figure in Quebec. He represented Châteauguay in the House of Commons of Canada from 1913 to 1917 as a Conservative.

He was born in Rutland, Canada West, the son of Patrick Morris and Ann McRae, and was educated at Saint-Chrysostome, Quebec. Foster settled at Aubrey, Quebec. He was mayor of Saint-Chrysostome for two years. He was defeated by James Pollock Brown when he ran for a federal seat in 1911; Morris was elected to the House of Commons in a 1913 by-election held after Brown's death. He was defeated by James Robb when he ran for reelection in the amalgamated riding of Châteauguay—Huntingdon in 1917. He died in Aubrey at the age of 73.

Electoral history 
By-election: On Mr. Brown's death, 30 May 1913

References

Members of the House of Commons of Canada from Quebec
Conservative Party of Canada (1867–1942) MPs
1857 births
1931 deaths